HVDC Kingsnorth was a high-voltage direct-current (HVDC) transmission system connecting Kingsnorth in Kent to two sites in London. It was at one time the only application of the technology of high voltage direct current transmission for the supply of transformer stations in a city, and the first HVDC link to be embedded within an AC system, rather than interconnecting two asynchronous systems.  It was also the first HVDC scheme to be equipped with self-tuning harmonic filters and to be controlled with a "Phase Locked Oscillator", a principle which subsequently became standard on all HVDC systems.

It was designed in the late 1960s and went into service in 1974. It ran from Kingsnorth power station as a 59 kilometers long bipolar (3-wire) underground cable. The positive pole operating at a voltage of +266 kV terminated at the converter station in Beddington near Croydon. The negative pole continued to run a further 26 kilometers at -266 kV line to a similar station at Willesden in North London.

There was also the possibility, if the converter station in Kingsnorth was out of service, to run the system as monopolar HVDC between the Beddington and Willesden stations. The HVDC Kingsnorth was one of the last HVDC schemes equipped with mercury vapour rectifiers, which were ARAG/4-valves designed by English Electric.  Each converter station for 266 kV consisted of two six-pulse valve bridges for 132 kV switched in series, which were each fed via a star-star and a star-delta connected transformer.

Apart from the Nelson River Bipole 1 system in Canada, all later-built HVDC systems used thyristor valves. The Kingsnorth HVDC scheme could transfer a maximum power of 640 megawatts (320 megawatts per pole).

In 1981, one mercury arc valve at Willesden Static Inverter Plant, was replaced by a H200 thyristor valve, developed by English Electric.

The system described was shut down in 1986 or 1987 following system reinforcement on the network it was embedded in. However the capacitor banks located at Kingsorth were used for voltage control on the network. These were later removed from the system completely in the mid 1980s? (1990s?) as they contained PCB.

Sites

References

External links 
 http://www.creativeworks.co.uk/clients/online_publications/Alstom/hvdc50years/offline/download.pdf , Page13-15

Infrastructure in London
Electrical interconnectors to and from Great Britain
HVDC transmission lines
Electric power infrastructure in England
Energy infrastructure completed in 1974
1974 establishments in England